Yoon Sung-hyun (born August 3, 1982) is a South Korean film director and screenwriter. Yoon's directorial debut, a graduation project, Bleak Night received rave reviews and won several Best New Director awards at the 48th Grand Bell Awards, 32nd Blue Dragon Film Awards and 12th Busan Film Critics Awards.

Filmography 
Boys (short film) (2008) - director, screenwriter, cinematographer, editor
Daytrip (short film) (2008) - director
Drink and Confess (short film) (2009) - director
Bleak Night (2011) - director, screenwriter, costume designer, editor
If You Were Me 5 (segment: "Banana Shake") (2011) - director, screenwriter
Jury (short film) (2013) - actor
 Time to Hunt (2020) - director, screenwriter

Awards 
2008 9th Jeonju International Film Festival: KT&G Sangsangmadang Award - Special Jury Award (Korean Short: Critics’ Week) (Boys)
2010 15th Busan International Film Festival:  Best New Director (Bleak Night)
2011 48th Grand Bell Awards: Best New Director (Bleak Night)
2011 32nd Blue Dragon Film Awards: Best New Director (Bleak Night)
2011 12th Busan Film Critics Awards: Best New Director (Bleak Night)

References

External links 
 
 
 

1982 births
Living people
South Korean film directors
South Korean screenwriters